Federal Highway 102 (Carretera Federal 102) is a Federal Highway of Mexico. The highway travels from Álamo, Veracruz in the east to Tamazunchale, San Luis Potosí in the west. From Orizatlán to Huejutla de Reyes, the route is signed as a Hidalgo state highway rather than a Federal Highway.

References

102